Ithiri Poove Chuvannapoove is a 1984 Indian Malayalam-language film, directed by Bharathan, with story written by Thikkodiyan and produced by P. V. Gangadharan. The film stars Madhu, Mammootty, Rahman, K R Vijaya, Suresh and Shobhana. The film has musical score by Ravindran.

Plot
Balagopalan is Unni's elder brother. Unni is a youth with friends from college. Theirs is a happy family. Balagopalan is a cop and Unni, from influences, becomes a naxalite. The story follows the dynamics of this relationship and also that of Unni's with his girlfriend.

Cast
Madhu as Unni's Father
Mammootty as Balagopalan
Rahman as Unni or Unnikrishnan
K. R. Vijaya as Meenakshi
Bhagyasri 
Suresh as Ravi
Shobhana as Subhadra
Nedumudi Venu as Potty Mannam
Lalithasree as Ammukutty

Songs
Lyrics by Kavalam Narayana Panikkar.

 "Omanathinkal Kidavo" - S. Janaki
 "Ponpularoli Poovithariya" - K. J. Yesudas, Lathika
 "Oru Theruvunaadaka Gaanam" - K. P. Brahmanandan, Bharathan, Raveendran

References

External links
 

1984 films
1980s Malayalam-language films